English Opera or The English Opera may refer to:

 Opera in English, performed since the 17th century
 The English National Opera, an English opera company founded by Lilian Baylis, originally based at Sadler's Wells Theatre 
 The Lyceum Theatre, London, commonly known as "The English Opera" or "The English Opera House" until the 1840s
 The English Opera Company, managed by Louisa Pyne and William Harrison which set up residence in Covent Garden at the Royal Opera House
 The Palace Theatre, London, originally named the Royal English Opera House and intended as a home for English Grand Opera